Ramsgate Beach is a suburb in southern Sydney, in the state of New South Wales, Australia. Ramsgate Beach is located 16 kilometres south of the Sydney central business district, in the Bayside Council and is part of the St George area. The postcode is 2217. Ramsgate is a separate suburb, to the west.

History

The area between the Cooks River and Georges River was originally known as Seven Mile Beach. It was changed to Lady Robinson's Beach in 1874 to honour Governor Sir Hercules Robinson's wife. Cook Park is named after Samuel Cook who advocated it as a public pleasure area. Ramsgate was named after the seaside resort in England. A model village was originally planned for the suburb but later abandoned.

Geography
Ramsgate Beach is surrounded by the suburbs of Monterey, Ramsgate and Sans Souci. Lady Robinson Beach and Cook Park run along the eastern border of Ramsgate Beach, on Botany Bay. The suburb is mostly residential with a shopping strip including a supermarket on Ramsgate Road, near The Grand Parade. Another shopping strip, including the post office, is located in Ramsgate on Rocky Point Road, near the intersection of Ramsgate Road.

Population

According to the 2016 census of Population, there were 1,660 people usually resident in Ramsgate Beach.  58.4% of people were born in Australia. 52.0% of people spoke only English at home. Other languages spoken at home included Greek at 12.6%. The most common responses for religious affiliation were Catholic 23.6%, Eastern Orthodox 18.5% and Anglican 12.8%.

Landmarks
 Lady Robinsons Beach
 Cook Park
 Ramsgate Beach Baths
 Ramsgate Baptist Church

References

Suburbs of Sydney
Botany Bay
Beaches of New South Wales
Bayside Council